The Clinch County School District is a public school district in Clinch County, Georgia based in Homerville, Georgia. It serves the communities of Argyle, Du Pont, Fargo, and Homerville.

Schools
The Clinch County School District has an elementary/middle school and one high school.

Elementary school 
Clinch County Elementary School

Middle school 
Clinch County Middle School

High school
Clinch County High School

References

External links

School districts in Georgia (U.S. state)
Education in Clinch County, Georgia